Syuzva is a rural locality (a settlement) in Ust-Berezovskoye Rural Settlement, Yurlinsky District, Perm Krai, Russia. The population was 85 as of 2010. There are 2 streets.

Geography 
Syuzva is located 67 km west of Yurla (the district's administrative centre) by road. Galechnik is the nearest rural locality.

References 

Rural localities in Yurlinsky District